Carve is a racing video game developed by Argonaut Games and published by Global Star Software released for the Xbox.

Two people play the game simultaneously in which the team travels the world to battle other racing teams on watercraft. The goal is to reach the top rank position. Challenges to players include weather, location and waves. There are eight individual racing styles available with tricks to perform. Carve has split screen options for multiplayer mode, which includes 2 online players and 4 offline players. It is a 480p resolution game with Dolby Digital 5.1 sound.

Reception

The game received "mixed" reviews according to the review aggregation website Metacritic.

References

External links
 

2004 video games
Argonaut Games games
Personal watercraft racing video games
Video games developed in the United Kingdom
Xbox games
Xbox-only games
Global Star Software games
Multiplayer and single-player video games